The Japanese American Internment Museum, also known as the WWII Japanese American Internment Museum and the Jerome-Rohwer Interpretive Museum & Visitor Center, is a history museum in McGehee, Arkansas. The museum features exhibits regarding the area history of Japanese American internment in the 1940s when more than 17,000 Japanese Americans were housed at nearby Rohwer War Relocation Center and Jerome War Relocation Center during World War II. Exhibits include a film, oral histories, photographs, personal artifacts and some art made by internees, as well as changing art exhibitions.

Visitors are encouraged to tour the remains of the Rohwer War Relocation Center, which is located about 17 miles away from the museum.  The site includes a memorial, cemetery, interpretive panels and audio kiosks.

The museum opened its doors on April 16, 2013, and is located in the south building of the historic McGehee Railroad Depot. It is one of several Arkansas State University Heritage Sites.

The dedication ceremony for the museum featured the actor, activist, and former camp incarceree George Takei giving a speech; his narration is also featured on a number of the audio displays.

See also 
 Museum of Japanese Internees in Tashkent, Uzbekistan

References

External links
 Museum - Rohwer Japanese American Relocation Center

Museums in Desha County, Arkansas
Internment of Japanese Americans
Museums of Japanese culture abroad in the United States
Ethnic museums in Arkansas
History museums in Arkansas
World War II museums in the United States
Museums established in 2013
2013 establishments in Arkansas
Arkansas State University
University museums in Arkansas